The 1989 Recopa Sudamericana was the first Recopa Sudamericana, a football competition for South American clubs that won the previous year's two most important competitions in the continent: the Copa Libertadores and the Supercopa Sudamericana. The inaugural edition was disputed between Nacional, winners of the 1988 Copa Libertadores, and Racing, winners of the 1988 Supercopa Sudamericana. The first leg was played on January 31 in Montevideo, while the second leg was played in Buenos Aires on February 6.

Nacional won the final series 4-1 on points as Daniel Fonseca of Nacional scored the first goal of the competition as well as the only one in this final.

Qualified teams

Rules 
The Recopa Sudamericana was played over two legs; home and away. The team that qualified via the Copa Libertadores played the first leg at home. The team that accumulated the most points —two for a win, one for a draw, zero for a loss— after the two legs was crowned the champion. In case of both teams tied on points after regulation of the second leg, the team with the best goal difference won. If the two teams hade equal goal difference, a penalty shoot-out ensued according to the Laws of the Game.

Background 
Nacional qualified to the Recopa Sudamericana by winning the 1988 Copa Libertadores. It was their third Copa Libertadores title and first in eight years, which they achieved by defeating Argentinean club Newell's Old Boys 3–1 on aggregate. Racing Club earned the right to dispute the trophy after winning the 1988 Supercopa Sudamericana, beating Cruzeiro 3–1 on points. The victory was the club's first international title since winning the 1967 Copa Libertadores.

Prior to the 1989 Recopa, Nacional and Racing Club had previously met four times in South American competition. The first meeting between the two sides took place in the Group 2 of the 1962 Copa Libertadores; Nacional beat Racing Club 3-2 at home, and held La Academia at a 2-2 draw in Avellaneda. Five years later, the two clubs met again in the 1967 Copa Libertadores, this time in the finals. Both legs of the series finished 0-0, requiring a tie-breaking playoff to be played. Racing Club came out on top, winning 2-1.

Venues 

The first leg was held in Estadio Centenario, built between 1929 and 1930 to host the 1930 FIFA World Cup, as well as to commemorate the centennial of Uruguay's first constitution. It is listed by FIFA as one of the football world's classic stadiums. Until then, the venue had hosted the final for the Copa América in 1942 and 1995 as well as a final series match for the Copa Libertadores in 1960, 1961, 1962, 1965, 1966, 1967, 1969, 1970, 1971, 1980, 1982, 1983, 1987, and 1988. Estadio Centenario had also hosted a playoff match for the Copa América in 1979 and several Copa Libertadores matches in  1968, 1973, and 1981.

The José Amalfitani Stadium, home of Vélez Sarsfield, was built in 1947 and later remodeled in preparation for the 1978 FIFA World Cup. It had a capacity for 49,540 spectators although it didn't provide seating for all of them like other Argentine stadiums.

Officials 
The referees for the 1989 Recopa Sudamericana were Romualdo Arppi Filho of Brazil and Gabriel González of Paraguay. Filho had been an international referee since 1960. He has refereed the 1986 FIFA World Cup final, the 1987 Copa América final, a final match of the 1973 Copa Libertadores, two finals for the Campeonato Brasileiro Série A in 1984 and 1985, and two Campeonato Paulista finals. González had been assigned very few important matches; his most significant work had been to referee a few games of the 1986 FIFA World Cup.

Match details

First leg

Second leg

References

Recopa Sudamericana
Recopa Sudamericana
r
r
Football in Buenos Aires
r
r
Football in Avellaneda
Football in Montevideo